Zheng Chunhua (born 1959) is a Chinese writer best known for writing children's literature. She is noted for her book Big Head Son and Small Head Dad, which was a besteller among children's literature, and the adapted animation with the same name, released in 1995, was also a big hit.

Biography
Zheng was born into a Hui people family, in Chun'an County, Zhejiang in 1959. After high school, she worked in a farm and soon became a nursery governess in 1979, after the Culture Revolution. Zheng started to publish works in 1980. That same year, her poem, Little Bed, won first prize at the Shanghai Youth Poetry Creation Contest. In 1981, she was assigned to Shanghai Adolescence and Children Press as an editor. Her noted book, Big Head Son and Small Head Dad, was published in 1990, and has been adapted for animation with the same name in 1995.

Works
 Big Head Son and Small Head Dad
 Not Square Not Round
 Adventures of the Postman
 A Family Photo
 Father Living on the Other Bank
 Kelakela Bed
 Moon Cakes for Family Get-togethers
 The Most Delicious Green Dumplings
 Who Is More Formidable
 The Special Boy Ma Mingjia
 Rice Porridge Under the Eaves
 Little Biscuit and Apron Mom

Adaptations
One of her works has been adapted for animation:

 Big Head Son and Small Head Dad (1995)

Awards and Commendations
  Big Head Son and Small Head Dad – 5th National Book Award, 19th Chen Bochui Children's Literature Award, 2001 Bing Xin Children's Literature Award, and 6th Song Qingling Literature Prize

Personal life
Zheng has two children, a son and a daughter.

References

1959 births
Nanjing University alumni
Writers from Hangzhou
Living people
Chinese women novelists
Chinese children's writers
Chinese women children's writers
Chen Bochui Children's Literature Award winners